Biscuit Tortoni, an Italian frozen dessert made from eggs and heavy cream
 Café Tortoni in Buenos Aires (named in honour of the Italian café owner of Paris)